Jason Mitchell (born July 19, 1981) is a wide receiver who was formerly with the Saskatchewan Roughriders.

Professional career
Previously, he was with the Jacksonville Jaguars organization.

Signed a contract with the Saskatchewan Roughriders of the CFL in 2007 and was released from the team on July 6, 2007. He has subsequently rejoined the Roughriders, as a member of their Developmental Squad, on July 12, 2007. He was moved to the active roster on July 27, 2007 and saw his CFL debut on July 28, 2007 against the Edmonton Eskimos. He caught one pass for seven yards in his debut with the Riders. He was subsequently released by the Riders on July 31, 2007. On January 23, 2008, he was signed to a one-year plus an option year contract with the Riders.

College career
Mitchell played college football at the University of Southern California.

High school career
Mitchell prepped at North Torrance High School.

References

Players of American football from Torrance, California
USC Trojans football players
American football wide receivers
Jacksonville Jaguars players
Saskatchewan Roughriders players
Living people
1981 births